The New Democratic Party of Serbia (NDSS or New DSS) is a national-conservative political party in Serbia.

Initially known and formed as Democratic Party of Serbia (DSS), the party was formed as a conservative split from the Democratic Party (DS), and has played a key role in the opposition during the 1990s. It was a part of the "Together" coalition and was later a founding member of the Democratic Opposition of Serbia (DOS). Its first leader, Vojislav Koštunica, was elected president of Yugoslavia in 2000, a role which he served until 2003. DSS left the DOS government in 2001, and served in the opposition until the 2003 parliamentary election, after which it managed to form a government with other right-wing parties. Koštunica was appointed prime minister, and after 2008, it went to the opposition again after being unable to form a government. It saw its decline in the 2010s, and it failed to pass the threshold in the 2014 parliamentary election, which led to Koštunica resigning from the position as party leader. He was replaced by Sanda Rašković Ivić, and in 2016, DSS managed to enter the National Assembly again, this time in a coalition with Dveri. Rašković Ivić was ousted after the parliamentary election, and was replaced by Miloš Jovanović as president of the party.

A former member of the European People's Party, it maintained a centre-right and moderate conservative image until the early 2010s, when the party shifted to a more right-wing and eurosceptic position. It leads the National Democratic Alternative (NADA) coalition, which took part in the 2022 general election.

History

1992–2000 
The Democratic Party of Serbia (DSS) was founded in 1992 by a breakaway nationalist faction of the Democratic Party (DS), which advocated involvement in the Democratic Movement of Serbia (DEPOS).

Founding members of the party were Vojislav Koštunica, Vladeta Janković, Đurđe Ninković, Draško Petrović, Mirko Petrović and Vladan Batić. The founding assembly was held on 26 July 1992 and elected Vojislav Koštunica as its first president. The first party assembly was held on 5 December 1992 and adopted the party's first manifesto.
The DSS first competed in the December 1992 parliamentary elections. As part of DEPOS, the DSS received 18 seats in the National Assembly of Serbia - which grew to 20 after non-party-aligned members of DEPOS decided to leave the Parliament. Soon, similar differences of opinion over ways in which to fight the ruling Socialist Party of Serbia and the DSS's belief in Serbian nationalism led to a division in DEPOS too. The DSS left the coalition in mid-1993.

Next parliamentary elections in Serbia were called prematurely for 19 December 1993. This time DSS ran independently and received seven seats. This was a period of the party's political stagnation as most nationalist votes went to the Serbian Radical Party. It did not have enough seats to significantly influence matters in Serbia and was left without representation in the Federal Assembly.

In 1996, opposition Zajedno (Together) coalition was created. DSS entered the 1996 federal parliamentary elections as part of the coalition and won four seats in the Federal Assembly.

2000–2008 
The DSS was a founding member of the Democratic Opposition of Serbia (DOS) whose presidential candidate and leader of the DSS, Vojislav Koštunica defeated Slobodan Milošević in the 2000 Yugoslav presidential election held on 24 September 2000 winning 50.24% of the vote.

In the December 2000 Serbian parliamentary election, the Democratic Opposition of Serbia won 64.7% of the popular vote, securing 176 seats in the National Assembly. The DSS was allocated 45 seats. In the ensuing Democratic Opposition of Serbia coalition government, DSS had very little influence with just two cabinet-level ministerial posts, that of Deputy Prime Minister (held by Aleksandar Pravdić) and Minister of Health (held by Obren Joksimović) as well as very few second tier posts of Deputy Minister. The DSS was unhappy with the direction of the DOS Government policy and split from the coalition in late 2001.

In the 2003 parliamentary election, the DSS won 17.7% of the popular vote, translating into 53 seats in the parliament. Of these 53 seats, three went to the People's Democratic Party (NDS), one to the Serbian Liberal Party and one to the Serbian Democratic Party (SDS).

In 2004 NDS left the coalition with DSS, leaving it with 50 seats in the National Assembly. However, in 2005 both the NDS and the SDS merged into the DSS, bringing its size to 52 seats in the National Assembly.

The DSS won 47 seats in coalition with New Serbia in the 2007 parliamentary election, receiving 667,615 votes or 16.55% of the total popular vote. DSS itself received 33 seats in the parliament, and formed a group together with New Serbia, the Serbian Democratic Renewal Movement and United Serbia.

The leader of the DSS since its foundation, Vojislav Koštunica, was the Prime Minister of Serbia between March 2004 and July 2008 heading up two coalition governments. The first coalition government between March 2004 and July 2007 in coalition with Serbian Renewal Movement and G17 Plus. The second coalition government between July 2007 and July 2008 in coalition with the Democratic Party and G17 Plus.

2008–2014
In the early 2008 parliamentary election held in May 2008 following the self-proclaimed declaration of independence by the Serbian province of Kosovo, the DSS won 30 seats in the National Assembly in coalition with New Serbia. It won 480,987 votes representing 11.62% of the electorate. In coalition with New Serbia 2008–10, it formed the second largest opposition block in the Serbian parliament.

Since 2008 the DSS has positioned itself as a staunch defender of the premise that Kosovo should remain within Serbia (in some shape or form) and that further negotiations must take place to determine a workable political outcome regarding Kosovo and Serbia. Because of this approach, the DSS is against Serbia joining the EU if in return it is bound to acknowledge the legitimacy of the self-proclaimed independent Kosovo.

The party has become increasingly nationalist and eurosceptic since the independence of Kosovo. In 2012, Vojislav Koštunica stated that the EU is destroying Serbia and that Serbia should abstain on EU membership. The party subsequently left the European People's Party in February 2012.

The party competed independently in the 2012 parliamentary elections in May 2012 and received around 7% of the popular vote (273,532 votes) translating into 21 Members of Parliament.

2014–present 
In 2014, founder and first president of DSS Vojislav Koštunica left the party over its abandonment of the idea of political neutrality. Subsequently, Slobodan Samardžić, Dragan Jočić, Vladeta Janković and Dejan Mihajlov also announced their departure in response to differences of opinion over the course of DSS.

On 26 January 2021, DSS and the Movement for the Restoration of the Kingdom of Serbia (POKS) signed an agreement on joint action and agreed on a joint political-program platform called the National-Democratic Alternative. In early May, the National-Democratic Alternative was transformed into a pre-electoral coalition. On 24 May, the 14th party assembly was held in which Jovanović was re-elected as the president of the party, while Dejan Šulkić, Zoran Sandić, and Predrag Marsenić were elected as vice presidents. DSS changed its name to New Democratic Party of Serbia following the 15th assembly on 29 May 2022.

Political positions 
Initially aligned on the centre-right on the political spectrum, it has shifted to the right-wing in the early 2010s. A national-conservative party, it is strongly opposed to the accession of Serbia to the European Union. It has been also described as conservative, nationalist, populist, and Christian democratic. It was historically supportive of Western integration and European Union, and was a member of the European People's Party until 2012.

Together with the People's Party, Serbian Party Oathkeepers, and Dveri, it signed a joint declaration for the "reintegration of Kosovo into the constitutional and legal order of Serbia" in October 2022.

List of presidents of the Democratic Party of Serbia

Acting leaders 
Ref:

Electoral performance

Parliamentary elections

Presidential elections

Positions held 
Major positions held by Democratic Party of Serbia members:

Notable members 

Vojislav Koštunica
Aleksandar Popović
Slobodan Samardžić
Aleksandar Pravdić
Dragan Jočić
Miloš Aligrudić
Radomir Naumov
Dragan Maršićanin
Predrag Bubalo
Vladeta Janković
Draško Petrović
Mirko Petrović
Đurđe Ninković
Milan Parivodić
Vladan Batić
Bora Đorđević
Dušan Prelević
Nenad Popović

See also 

Politics of Serbia
List of political parties in Serbia

References

External links 

Democratic Party of Serbia. Official website.
Democratic Party of Serbia Youth
Democratic Party of Serbia Belgrade
Democratic Party of Serbia Economic Council

Conservative parties in Serbia
Eastern Orthodox political parties
Eurosceptic parties in Serbia
International Democrat Union member parties
Political parties established in 1992
1992 establishments in Serbia
National conservative parties
Democratic Party (Serbia) breakaway groups
Social conservative parties
Serb nationalist parties
Right-wing parties in Europe
Nationalist parties in Serbia
Christian democratic parties in Europe